The Charm  is an album by drummer T. S. Monk which was recorded in 1995 and released on the Blue Note label.

Reception

The AllMusic review by Scott Yanow stated "T.S. Monk, by successfully keeping his sextet together as a regularly working outfit for several years, has been able to form a recognizable group sound in the hard bop tradition ... has no weak links and is one of the most consistently satisfying jazz groups from the mid-'90s. Their fine disc is easily recommended".

Track listing
 "Budini" (Buddy Montgomery) – 6:52
 "The Dealer Takes Four" (Rodgers Grant) – 4:38
 "Jean Marie" (Ronnie Mathews) – 6:32
 "Marvelous Marvin" (Marty Sheller) – 4:37
 "Bolivar Blues" (Thelonious Monk) – 8:53
 "The Highest Mountain" (Clifford Jordan) – 8:00
 "Rejuvenate" (Bobby Porcelli) – 5:07
 "Just Waiting" (Melba Liston) – 5:49
 "Gypsy Folk Tales" (Walter Davis Jr.) – 5:44

Personnel
T. S. Monk – drums 
Don Sickler – trumpet
Bobby Porcelli – alto saxophone, flute
Willie Williams – tenor saxophone, soprano saxophone, flute 
Ronnie Mathews – piano 
Scott Colley – bass

References

Blue Note Records albums
T. S. Monk albums
1995 albums